Matt Shearer (born October 19, 1973 in Whitby, Ontario) is a retired lacrosse player.  Shearer retired after the 2007 NLL season following a ten-year career in the National Lacrosse League.

Statistics

NLL
Reference:

College
Shearer played one season at Loyola College where he scored 30 goals and had 15 assists in 1997.

References

1973 births
Canadian lacrosse players
Colorado Mammoth players
Lacrosse people from Ontario
Living people
Sportspeople from Whitby, Ontario
Toronto Rock players